The First 4 men's lacrosse invitational was an annual college lacrosse event held in California with the feature event being a double-header involving four NCAA Division I men's lacrosse teams. The event is representative of the recent expansion of the sport far afield from its traditional strongholds of Maryland and New York. The inaugural event took place at the Home Depot Center, now known as Dignity Health Sports Park, in Carson, California on March 12, 2005. It drew a crowd of 7,182 spectators. An event was planned for 2009, but cancelled due to a scheduling conflict and never resumed.

Results

References

NCAA lacrosse
Recurring sporting events established in 2005
Recurring sporting events disestablished in 2009
College lacrosse competitions in the United States
Lacrosse in California
2005 establishments in California
2009 disestablishments in California